Thin Sumbwegam (born 12 March 1930) is a Burmese long-distance runner. He competed in the marathon at the 1964 Summer Olympics and the 1968 Summer Olympics.

References

External links
 

1930 births
Possibly living people
Athletes (track and field) at the 1964 Summer Olympics
Athletes (track and field) at the 1968 Summer Olympics
Burmese male long-distance runners
Burmese male marathon runners
Olympic athletes of Myanmar
People from Myitkyina
Southeast Asian Games medalists in athletics
Southeast Asian Games gold medalists for Myanmar